is Yui Horie's second album. The name of the album could be translated "The adventures of the Black Cat with the Moon Balloon." The name of the Black Cat League, Yui Horie fan club, probably originates itself from this album.

Track listing
 朝の声    (Asa no koe, voice of the morning)
 この指とまれ    (Kono yubi tomare, Touch this finger)
 フェイク・ファー    (Feiku fā, Fake fur)
 Pure
 Love Destiny - Album Mix
 Gravity
 翼 - Album Mix    (Tsubasa, Wings)
 月の気球    (Tsuki no kikyū, Moon balloon)
 どんなことだって    (Donna koto datte, Whatever may happen)
 心のカギ    (Kokoro no kagi, Key to the heart)
 So depecher
 新しいドアへ‥    (Atarashii doa e, Towards a new door)
 小さじ一杯の勇気    (Kosaji ippai no yūki, A little spoonful of courage)

Yui Horie albums
2001 albums